This is a list of plant names in Dacian, surviving from ancient botanical works such as Dioscorides' De Materia Medica (abb. MM) and Pseudo-Apuleius' Herbarius (abb. Herb.). Dacian plant names are one of the primary sources left to us for studying the Dacian language, an ancient language of South Eastern Europe. This list also includes a Bessian plant name and a Moesian plant name, both neighboring Daco-Thracian tribes.

A separate list exists containing Romanian words of possible Dacian origin that form the Eastern Romance substratum.

See also
 Dacian language
 List of Dacian words
 List of Romanian words of possible Dacian origin
 List of Dacian names

References

External links

 Sorin Olteanu's Project: Linguae Thraco-Daco-Moesorum - The Dacian Plant Names

Dacian language
Dacian plant names
Flora of Romania